KSQY (95.1 FM) is a radio station broadcasting a mainstream rock format. The station known as "K-SKY" is licensed to Deadwood, South Dakota and serves the Rapid City listening area.  K-SKY is owned by Haugo Broadcasting, Inc.

History
95.1 K-SKY began broadcasting in August 1982  from a tower on the summit of Terry Peak in Lead, South Dakota giving the station a very large coverage area that reaches parts of five states.  K-SKY uses a 17,000 watt booster licensed to Rapid City to help cover the Rapid City metro with a stronger signal.

During the mid-1980s, K-SKY was one of the highest rated Album-oriented rock stations in the US.  Through the years, K-SKY has changed formats to Classic rock to Adult Album Alternative (AAA).

The original K-SKY studios were located at 666 Main Street in downtown Deadwood. In 1998, Haugo Broadcasting (owner of KSQY) acquired Rapid City stations KIQK "Kick 104" and KTOQ "K-Talk 1340" from Tom-Tom Communications, then owned by NBC news anchor Tom Brokaw. Soon after the purchase, KSQY moved its studios to Rapid City and joined its new sister stations. In Sept 2008, Haugo Broadcasting moved into its new facilities at 3601 Canyon Lake Drive.

References

External links

SQY
Mainstream rock radio stations in the United States
Radio stations established in 1982
1982 establishments in South Dakota